Mid Valley Publications is a media company based in Winton, California, founded in 1963 by John M. Derby.

Newspapers 

Mid Valley Publications owns and publishes 7 weekly newspapers in the Central Valley of California.

Weekly newspapers

 Merced County Times - Merced, California
 Waterford News - Waterford, California
 Hughson Chronicle - Hughson, California
 Atwater Times - Atwater, California
 Winton Times - Winton, California
 Hilmar Times - Hilmar, California
 Denair Dispatch - Denair, California

Shoppers and other Specials
 Mid Valley Classifieds - Central Valley, California
 Central California Bridal Special - Central Valley, California

Other publications printed by Mid Valley
 Valley Entertainment Monthly, 1993–1994, Turlock, California

External links
Mid Valley Publications website

Publishing companies based in California
Mass media in Merced County, California
Companies based in Merced County, California